Jin Hae-soo (born June 26, 1986) is a South Korean professional baseball pitcher for the LG Twins of the KBO League.

References

External links
Career statistics and player information from Korea Baseball Organization

LG Twins players
South Korean baseball players
SSG Landers players
Kia Tigers players
KBO League pitchers
Sportspeople from Busan
1986 births
Living people